Erich Seidel may refer to:

 Erich Seidel, West German slalom canoeist
 Erich Seidel (ophthalmologist), German ophthalmologist
 Erich Seidel (swimmer), German swimmer